Todd County is a county located in the U.S. state of Kentucky. As of the 2020 census, the population was 12,243. Its county seat is Elkton. The county is named for Colonel John Todd, who was killed at the Battle of Blue Licks in 1782 during the American Revolution.

History

Early history
Todd County consists of two geographical regions known historically as the high country to the north and low country to the south. The northern highlands consist of steep-sloped sandstone terrain with forests of oak, walnut and poplar. The landscape contains steep bluffs and sharp rises and falls within the terrain. The southern lowlands consist of rolling limestone flatlands void of aquifer sinks and consist of dense but sparse forests of oak, walnut poplar and ash. The historic inhabitants of the region before European encounter were the Iroquoian language-speaking Cherokee, who had migrated centuries earlier from areas around the Great Lakes. They used the lands for hunting and gathering.

Todd County lies within what was originally considered the western portion of the Commonwealth of Virginia. Many of the original white settlers came when the area was still considered part of Virginia. This part of southern Kentucky was designated to be awarded to Virginia veterans of the American Revolutionary War as payment for their services.

Justinian Cartwright may have been the first settle in what is now Todd County. However, the first proven residents are Edward Shanklin Jr., Matthew and David Rolston, and John Huston and his sons James and Granville Huston. Samuel Davis, father of Jefferson Davis, and John Wilson were also early settlers of the county. Kentucky Governor Greenup made the first Kentucky land grants to veterans William Croghan, David Logan, Edward Shanklin Jr., and John Wilson, among others.

Todd County was created in response to a petition for "home government," since travel to the county seats of Logan and Christian was arduous. The petition had been written by the magisterial court, consisting of Edward Shanklin, John Gray, Robert Coleman, Henry Gorin, John Taylor, H. C. Ewing, John S Anderson, William Hopper, John Mann and Joseph Frazer, had made the request. The legislature of the Commonwealth of Kentucky accordingly passed an act creating of the county from portions of Christian and Logan counties on April 1, 1820. The new county was named for Colonel John Todd, who had been killed at the Battle of Blue Licks in 1782.

Development 
Agriculture is a revered tradition in Todd County. The lowlands are of the finest rich soil types, including "Pembroke" soil. The lowlands are prized for their high growth yields. In the early 19th century, Major John Gray established a stagecoach hub in the county with travel routes radiating to larger American cities from the central point. His widely known Stagecoach Inn located in "Graysville," now Guthrie, Kentucky, was at the center of the travel routes.  Major Gray's stagecoach empire was highly successful, and he soon became wealthy due to its popularity in the region. Major Gray built a house, a simple two-story shed-roofed, brick one-pile dwelling, now known as "Halcyon," or the John Gray House.

Gray wanted a town to be established near his home that would become the county seat. Gray designed the city, which included a town square from which hundreds of lots radiated. He called it "Elkton" after the elk herds that watered at a spring near the town center. Gray designed the town square as a trapezoid instead of a square, with the south side of the town square larger than the north so that as the sun traversed across the sky, the buildings on the east and west would benefit from prolonged periods of daily sunlight. Gray contributed funding for a county courthouse, which was erected at the center of the square. The brick building stood two stories with a cupola at the top.

After Major Gray died, the building was deemed in a state of ruin due to improper construction methods and torn down to erect a new courthouse. The new Todd County courthouse was erected by order of the Fiscal Court in 1834. R. Rowland designed the building in the Federal Style with an integration of Greek-Revival style motifs. The brick building, which is extant in the 21st century, stands two stories tall with tripartite windows and large Greek-Revival lintels. The building originally had a smaller federal style cupola, but this was later replaced with a late Victorian clock tower in the second Empire style, which remains today.

Civil War 
Kentucky was a source of slaves for the cotton plantations in the lower South, and the slave trade was a profitable business for many Kentuckians. However, most Kentuckians did not own slaves. Those who did were wealthy plantation owners who stood to lose a lot if slavery were abolished. The major slave-owning areas in the state were the Bluegrass region, Henderson and Oldham counties on the Ohio River, and the western Kentucky counties of Trigg, Christian, Todd, and Warren. Many Kentuckians from these areas joined the Confederate army. Nevertheless, Kentucky's allegiance was divided during the Civil War. The state was officially neutral until September 1861, when it pledged its support to the Union. In response, a pro-Confederate Confederate government of Kentucky was formed by representatives from several Kentucky counties, with a second capital at Bowling Green.

Geography 

Adjacent counties
 Muhlenberg County  (north)
 Logan County  (east)
 Robertson County, Tennessee  (southeast)
 Montgomery County, Tennessee  (southwest)
 Christian County  (west)

Demographics 

As of the census of 2000, there were 11,971 people, 4,569 households, and 3,367 families residing in the county. The racial makeup of the county was 89.32% White, 8.75% Black or African American, 0.15% Native American, 0.17% Asian, 0.03% Pacific Islander, 0.87% from other races, and 0.71% from two or more races.  1.66% of the population were Hispanic or Latino of any race.

There were 4,569 households, out of which 33.50% had children under the age of 18 living with them, 58.70% were married couples living together, 11.60% had a female householder with no husband present, and 26.30% were non-families. 23.00% of all households were made up of individuals, and 11.10% had someone living alone who was 65 years of age or older.  The average household size was 2.59 and the average family size was 3.05.

In the county, the population was spread out, with 26.60% under the age of 18, 8.70% from 18 to 24, 28.40% from 25 to 44, 22.40% from 45 to 64, and 14.00% who were 65 years of age or older.  The median age was 36 years. For every 100 females there were 94.80 males.  For every 100 females age 18 and over, there were 92.70 males.

The median income for a household in the county was $29,718, and the median income for a family was $36,043. Males had a median income of $28,502 versus $20,340 for females. The per capita income for the county was $15,462.  About 14.70% of families and 17.20% of the population were below the poverty line, including 21.90% of those under age 18 and 22.00% of those age 65 or over.

Attractions 

 Green River Female Academy
 Milliken Memorial Community House
 Old Oaks Farm
 Old Todd County Courthouse
 Jefferson Davis State Historic Site
 Robert Penn Warren Birthplace
 Glover's Cave
 Liberty Hall
 Edwards Hall
 John Gray House, "Halcyon"
 Northington
 Sunny Side Acres
 Pilot Rock
 Holly Hills
 Runnymede
 Guthrie Transportation Museum

Communities

Cities
 Elkton (county seat)
 Guthrie
 Trenton

Census-designated places
 Allensville
 Fairview (partially in Christian County)

Other unincorporated communities

 Allegre
 Claymour
 Clifty
 Daysville
 Hadensville
 Kirkmansville
 Pea Ridge
 Penicktown
 Pinchem
 Sharon Grove
 Tiny Town
 Tress Shop
 Tyewhoppety

Notable residents
 George Street Boone, liberal constitutional scholar
 Benjamin Bristow, first Solicitor General of the United States and a former U.S. Treasury Secretary
 Mary Louise Milliken Childs, American philanthropist
 Jefferson Davis, President of the Confederacy
 Dorothy Dix (Elizabeth Merriwether Gilmer), columnist
 Caroline Meriwether Goodlett, co-founder of the United Daughters of the Confederacy
 Caroline Gordon, author of nine novels
 Kent Greenfield, American major league baseball player 
 James Clark McReynolds, former Associate Justice of the United States Supreme Court
 Roger Q. Mills, former Texas U.S. Senator (1892-1899)
 Paul Rudolph, architect
 Edward Shanklin Sr., Revolutionary War soldier and county founding father
 James Gordon Shanklin, FBI Agent
 Jess Sweetser, first American-born golfer to win the British Amateur
 David S. Terry, California jurist and politician
 Robert Penn Warren, first poet laureate of the United States

Politics

See also

 National Register of Historic Places listings in Todd County, Kentucky

References

External links

 Kentucky Atlas & Gazetter Todd County Page

 
1820 establishments in Kentucky
Populated places established in 1820
Kentucky counties